Symbiosis (mutualism) appears in fiction, especially science fiction, as a plot device. It is distinguished from parasitism in fiction, a similar theme, by the mutual benefit to the organisms involved, whereas the parasite inflicts harm on its host.

Relationships

Relationships between species in early science fiction were often imaginatively parasitic, with the parasites draining the vital energy of their human hosts and taking over their minds, as in Arthur Conan Doyle's 1895 The Parasite.

After the Second World War, science fiction moved towards more mutualistic relationships, as in Ted White's 1970 By Furies Possessed; Brian Stableford argues that White was consciously opposing the xenophobia of Robert Heinlein's 1951 The Puppet Masters which involved a parasitic relationship close to demonic possession, with a more positive attitude towards aliens. Stableford notes, however, that Octavia Butler's 1984 Clay's Ark and other of her works such as Fledgling, and Dan Simmons's 1989 Hyperion take an ambivalent position, in which the aliens may confer powers such as Hyperion'''s ability to regenerate continually—but at a price, in its case an incremental loss of intelligence at each regeneration.

In Star Trek, the Trill were a race of humanoids who incorporated a long-living symbiont. One of them was a main character on the series Star Trek: Deep Space Nine.

In the series Stargate SG-1, both the principal villains, the Goa'uld and their benevolent versions, the Tok'ra were symbionts who grafted themselves into the human nervous system.

The Force in the Star Wars universe is described by the fictional seer Obi-Wan Kenobi as "an energy field created by all living things". In The Phantom Menace, Qui-Gon Jinn says microscopic lifeforms called midi-chlorians, inside all living cells, allow characters with enough of these symbionts in their cells to feel and use the Force.

In Douglas Adams's humorous 1978 The Hitchhiker's Guide to the Galaxy'', the Babel fish lives in its human host's ear, feeding on the energy of its host's brain waves, in return translating any language to the host's benefit.

In the Ultraman series, the titular aliens take human bodies to rest in and hide among society, while the hosts gain inhuman levels of speed and strength.

See also

 Evolution in fiction
 Genetics in fiction

References 

Biology and culture